John Cade (1912–1980) was an Australian psychiatrist. 

John Cade may also refer to:

Jack Cade (1420–1450), leader of the Kent Rebellion
John Cade (MP) (fl. 1571) for Knaresborough (UK Parliament constituency)
John Cade (antiquarian) (1734–1806), English tradesman and writer on Roman remains
John Cade (jockey) (1751–1826), St. Leger winning British jockey 
Jack Cade (scout) (fl. 1861), scout in the Federal army in Western Virginia
John H. Cade, Jr. (1928–1988), Louisiana Republican state chairman
John A. Cade (1929–1996), Maryland State Senator

Characters 
Johnny Cade, a character in the 1967 novel The Outsiders by S. E. Hinton